This article contains information about the literary events and publications of 2002.

Events
March 16 – Authorities in Saudi Arabia arrest and jail the poet Abdul Mohsen Musalam and dismiss a newspaper editor following the publication of Musalam's poem "The Corrupt on Earth", which criticizes the state's Islamic judiciary, accusing some judges of being corrupt and issuing unfair rulings for personal benefit.
March 31 – American Writers: A Journey Through History resumes its run on C-SPAN, having been interrupted by the September 11 attacks and their aftermath.
May – The results of a poll of 100 authors conducted in Norway are announced, leading to the Bokklubben World Library beginning publication.
October 16 – Bibliotheca Alexandrina (designed by Snøhetta) is inaugurated in Alexandria, Egypt.
November – Raymond Benson releases his final James Bond novel, based on the film Die Another Day, bringing to a close an uninterrupted series of novels featuring Ian Fleming's character that started in 1981.
Randell Cottage Writers' Residency established in Wellington for New Zealand and French authors.

New books

Fiction
Alaa Al Aswany – The Yacoubian Building (عمارة يعقوبيان, ʿImārat Yaʿqūbīān)
Aaron Allston – Enemy Lines: Rebel Dream and Enemy Lines: Rebel Stand
Jean M. Auel – The Shelters of Stone
Paul Auster – The Book of Illusions
Iain Banks – Dead Air
Greg Bear – Vitals
Raymond Benson – Die Another Day and The Man with the Red Tattoo
Nelson Bond – The Far Side of Nowhere
Xurxo Borrazás – Pensamentos Impuros
William Boyd – Any Human Heart
Mircea Cărtărescu – The Encyclopedia of Dragons (Enciclopedia zmeilor)
Stephen L. Carter – The Emperor of Ocean Park
Ted Chiang – Stories of Your Life and Others
Bernard Cornwell – Sharpe's Prey, Sharpe's Skirmish and Vagabond
Michael Crichton – Prey
Elaine Cunningham – Dark Journey
 Dan Doboș – The Abbey
L. Sprague de Camp – Aristotle and the Gun and Other Stories
Dave Eggers – You Shall Know Our Velocity
Janet Evanovich – Hard Eight
Michel Faber – The Crimson Petal and the White
Giorgio Faletti – Io uccido
Mick Farren – Underland
Nancy Farmer – The House of The Scorpion
Elena Ferrante – I giorni dell'abbandono (The Days of Abandonment)
Alan Dean Foster – The Approaching Storm
Horace L. Gold and L. Sprague de Camp – None But Lucifer
Jean-Christophe Grangé – Le Concile de pierre
Niall Griffiths – Sheepshagger
John Grisham – The Summons
Margaret Peterson Haddix – Among the Betrayed
Peter Handke – Crossing the Sierra de Gredos
Joanne Harris – Coastliners
John D. Harvey – The Cleansing
Aleksandar Hemon – Nowhere Man
Carl Hiaasen – Hoot
Rabee Jaber – رحلة الغرناطي (Rahlat al-Gharnati, "The Journey of the Granadian")
Stephen King – Everything's Eventual: 14 Dark Tales and From a Buick 8
Rachel Klein – The Moth Diaries
Dean R. Koontz – By the Light of the Moon and One Door Away from Heaven
Ursula K. Le Guin – The Birthday of the World (anthology including Paradises Lost)
Sallie Lowenstein – Sender Unknown
Robert Ludlum – The Sigma Protocol
Jon McGregor – If Nobody Speaks of Remarkable Things
Valerio Massimo Manfredi – The Last Legion
Javier Marías – Your Face Tomorrow Volume 1: Fever and Spear (Tu rostro mañana 1. Fiebre y lanza)
Rohinton Mistry – Family Matters
Haruki Murakami (村上 春樹) – Kafka on the Shore (海辺のカフカ, Umibe no Kafuka)
Taslima Nasrin – Forashi Premik (French Lover)
Joseph O'Connor – Star of the Sea
Chuck Palahniuk – Lullaby
Orhan Pamuk – Snow
Ann Patchett – Bel Canto
James Patterson – Beach House
Terry Pratchett – Night Watch
Libby Purves – Mother Country
Pascal Quignard – Les Ombres errantes
Kathy Reichs – Grave Secrets
Nora Roberts – Face the Fire
Joel C. Rosenberg – The Last Jihad
R. A. Salvatore – Star Wars Episode II: Attack of the Clones
Samanta Schweblin – El núcleo del disturbio
Alice Sebold – The Lovely Bones
Carol Shields – Unless
Vladimir Sorokin – Ice
Danielle Steel – The Cottage
David Storey – As It Happened
Matthew Stover – Traitor
Thomas Sullivan – Born Burning
Donna Tartt – The Little Friend
Hồ Anh Thái – Cõi người rung chuông tận thế (The Apocalypse Bell Tolls in the Human World)
William Trevor – The Story of Lucy Gault
Andrew Vachss – Only Child
Guy Vanderhaeghe – The Last Crossing
Barbara Vine – The Blood Doctor
Sarah Waters – Fingersmith
Darren Williams – Angel Rock
Walter Jon Williams – Destiny's Way
Roger Zelazny – The Last Defender of Camelot

Children and young people
Chris Van Allsburg – Zathura
Neil Gaiman – Coraline
Bob Graham – Jethro Byrd, Fairy Child
Kathleen Hague (with Michael Hague) – Good Night, Fairies
Isabel Hoving – The Dream Merchant
Tony Johnston (with Barry Moser) – That Summer
Ulrich Karger – Geisterstunde im Kindergarten (Ghost Times in Kindergarten, translated as The Scary Sleepover)
Jenny Nimmo – Midnight for Charlie Bone
Margie Palatini (with Barry Moser) – Earthquack!
Christopher Paolini (with John Jude Palencar) – Eragon (first in the Inheritance Cycle of four books)
Jerry Pinkney
 The Nightingale
 Noah's Ark
Lemony Snicket – The Carnivorous Carnival
Leander Watts – Stonecutter
Jacqueline Wilson – Girls in Tears (fourth in the Girls series of four books)

Drama
Edward Albee – The Goat, or Who Is Sylvia?
Caryl Churchill – A Number
Nilo Cruz – Anna in the Tropics
Zlatko Topčić – Time Out
Peter Verhelst – Blush

Poetry

Neil Astley (ed.) – Staying Alive: real poems for unreal times (anthology)
Jim Dodge – Rain on the River
Linton Kwesi Johnson – Mi Revalueshanary Fren
Grazyna Miller – Alibi of a butterfly

Non-fiction
Peter Ackroyd – Albion: The Origins of the English Imagination
Andrew Alpern – The New York Apartment Houses of Rosario Candela and James Carpenter
Jeffrey Archer (as FF 8282) – A Prison Diary: Volume 1: Belmarsh: Hell
T. J. Binyon – Pushkin: A Biography
John Brockman (editor) – The Next Fifty Years: Science in the First Half of the Twenty-First Century
Stuart Christie – Granny Made me an Anarchist
Alphonse Daudet (died 1897), translated by Julian Barnes – In the Land of Pain (first English translation of La Doulou)
Gerina Dunwich – A Witch's Guide to Ghosts and the Supernatural
Lindy Edwards – How to Argue with an Economist: Reopening Political Debate in Australia
Koenraad Elst – Ayodhya – The Case Against the Temple
Tye R. Farrell and Jeffrey Morrow – University of Psychogenic Fugue
Aminatta Forna – The Devil That Danced on the Water: A Daughter's Quest
Pim Fortuyn – De puinhopen van acht jaar Paars
Michael J. Fox – Lucky Man: A Memoir
Stephen J. Gould – I Have Landed
Peter Jennings – In Search of America
B. B. Lal – The Sarasvatī Flows On: The Continuity of Indian Culture
Judith Levine – Harmful to Minors
Gabriel García Márquez – Vivir para contarla (autobiography)
Jeremy Paxman – The Political Animal
Neil Peart – Ghost Rider
Åsne Seierstad – The Bookseller of Kabul
Arun Shourie – Worshipping False Gods
Rachel Simon – Riding the Bus with My Sister
Bob Smith – Hamlet's Dresser
Daniel Snowman – The Hitler Émigrés: The Cultural Impact on Britain of Refugees from Nazism
David Southwell – Dirty Cash
James B. Stewart – Heart of a Soldier
Paul Theroux – Dark Star Safari
Rick Warren – The Purpose Driven Life
Alison Watt – The Last Island

Deaths
January 12 – Lady Violet Powell, British critic and biographer (born 1912)
 January 17 – Camilo José Cela, Nobel-winningSpanish writer (born 1916)
January 28 – Astrid Lindgren, Swedish children's author (born 1907)
February 8 – Joachim Hoffmann, German historian (born 1930)
February 21 – A. L. Barker, English novelist (born 1918)
February 27 – Spike Milligan, Indian-born British-Irish comedian, screenwriter and poet (born 1918)
March 21 – Thomas Flanagan, American historical novelist (born 1923)
April 6 – Martin Sperr, German dramatist (born 1944)
April 24 – Ismith Khan, Trinidad-born novelist (born 1925)
 April 27 – George Alec Effinger, American science fiction author (born 1947)
May 6 – Pim Fortuyn, Dutch political columnist and writer (born 1948)
May 17 – Dave Berg, American cartoonist (born 1920)
May 20 – Stephen J. Gould, American paleontologist, biologist and writer (born 1941)
June 2 – Flora Lewis, American journalist (born 1922)
June 13 – R. W. B. Lewis, American critic (born 1917)
June 20
Timothy Findley, Canadian novelist and playwright (born 1930)
Kenneth Kantzer, American theologian (born 1917)
June 24 – John Kincaid McNeillie (also Ian Niall), Scottish novelist and non-fiction writer (born 1916)
July 23 – Chaim Potok, American writer (born 1929)
August 25 – Dorothy Hewett, Australian poet and playwright (born 1923)
September 17 – Eileen Colwell, English children's librarian (born 1904)
September 20 – Joan Littlewood, English theatre director and biographer (born 1914)
October 13 – Stephen E. Ambrose, American historian and biographer (born 1936)
October 21 – Harbhajan Singh, Indian Punjabi poet and critic (born 1920)
October 27 – Sesto Pals, Romanian Israeli poet and philosopher (cancer, born ca. 1912)
October 28 – Sugathapala de Silva, Sri Lankan dramatist, novelist and translator writing in Sinhalese (born 1928)
November 8 – Jon Elia, Pakistani poet and philosopher writing in Urdu (born 1931)
December 12 – Dee Brown, American novelist and historian (born 1908)
December 24 – Kjell Aukrust, Norwegian author, poet and artist (born 1920)

Awards
Nobel Prize for Literature: Imre Kertész

Australia
The Australian/Vogel Literary Award: Danielle Wood, The Alphabet of Light and Dark
C. J. Dennis Prize for Poetry: Robert Gray, Afterimages
Kenneth Slessor Prize for Poetry: Alan Wearne, The Lovemakers
Mary Gilmore Prize: Geraldine McKenzie, Duty
Miles Franklin Award: Tim Winton, Dirt Music

Canada
Giller Prize: Austin Clarke, The Polished Hoe
See 2002 Governor General's Awards for a complete list of winners and finalists for those awards.
Griffin Poetry Prize: Christian Bök, Eunoia and Alice Notley, Disobedience
Edna Staebler Award for Creative Non-Fiction: Tom Allen, Rolling Home

France
Prix Décembre: Pierre Michon, Abbés and Corps du Roi
Prix Femina: Chantal Thomas, Les adieux à la reine
Prix Femina (non-fiction): Michael Barry, Massoud
Prix Goncourt: Pascal Quignard, Les Ombres errantes
Prix Médicis French: Daniel Desmarquet, Kafka et les jeunes filles
Prix Médicis Non-Fiction: Anne F. Garréta, Pas un jour
Prix Médicis International: Philip Roth, The Human Stain

United Kingdom
Booker Prize: Yann Martel, Life of Pi
Caine Prize for African Writing: Binyavanga Wainaina, "Discovering Home"
Carnegie Medal for children's literature: Sharon Creech, Ruby Holler
James Tait Black Memorial Prize for fiction: Jonathan Franzen, The Corrections
James Tait Black Memorial Prize for biography: Jenny Uglow, The Lunar Men: The Friends Who Made the Future 1730–1810
Cholmondeley Award: Moniza Alvi, David Constantine, Liz Lochhead, Brian Patten
Eric Gregory Award: Caroline Bird, Christopher James, Jacob Polley, Luke Heeley, Judith Lal, David Leonard Briggs, Eleanor Rees, Kathryn Simmonds
Samuel Johnson Prize: Margaret MacMillan, Peacemakers: The Paris Peace Conference of 1919 and Its Attempt to End War
Whitbread Best Book Award: Philip Pullman, The Amber Spyglass
Orange Prize for Fiction: Ann Patchett, Bel Canto
Queen's Gold Medal for Poetry: Peter Porter

United States
Agnes Lynch Starrett Poetry Prize: Shao Wei, Pulling a Dragon's Teeth
Aiken Taylor Award for Modern American Poetry: Grace Schulman
Arthur Rense Prize for poetry: B.H. Fairchild
Bernard F. Connors Prize for Poetry: Timothy Donnelly, “His Long Imprison'd Thought”
Bobbitt National Prize for Poetry: Alice Fulton, Felt
Brittingham Prize in Poetry: Anna George Meek, Acts of Contortion
Compton Crook Award: Wen Spencer, Alien Taste
Frost Medal: Galway Kinnell
Hugo Award: Neil Gaiman, American Gods
National Book Award for Fiction: Julia Glass, Three Junes
National Book Critics Circle Award: Ian McEwan, Atonement
Newbery Medal for children's literature: Linda Sue Park, A Single Shard
PEN/Faulkner Award for Fiction: Ann Patchett, Bel Canto
Pulitzer Prize for Drama: Suzan-Lori Parks, Topdog/Underdog
Pulitzer Prize for Fiction: Richard Russo, Empire Falls
Pulitzer Prize for Poetry: Carl Dennis, Practical Gods
Wallace Stevens Award: Ruth Stone
Whiting Awards:
Fiction: Jeffery Renard Allen, Justin Cronin, Kim Edwards, Michelle Huneven, Danzy Senna
Plays: Melissa James Gibson, Evan Smith
Poetry: Elizabeth Arnold, David Gewanter, Joshua Weiner

Other
Camões Prize: Maria Velho da Costa
Finlandia Prize: Kari Hotakainen Trench Street
International Dublin Literary Award: Michel Houellebecq, Les Particules Élémentaires
Macmillan Writers' Prize for Africa Adult Fiction: Yvonne Vera, Stone Virgins
Premio Nadal: Ángela Vallvey, Los estados carenciales
SAARC Literary Award: Laxmi Chand Gupta

Notes

References

 
Literature
Years of the 21st century in literature